Mihajlo Manović (born 4 April 1948) is a Serbian–Croatian former professional basketball coach and player.

Playing career
Manović played the majority of his career with Jugoplastika, most notably winning the 1970–71 and 1976–77 national league titles. Intercontinentally, Manović finished second in the 1971–72 FIBA European Champions Cup and 1972–73 FIBA European Cup Winners' Cup and won back-to-back FIBA Korać Cup titles in 1975–76 and 1976–77.

National team career
In August 1966, Manović was a member of the Yugoslavia junior team that won a silver medal at the European Championship for Junior Men in Porto San Giorgio, Italy. Over four tournament games, he averaged 1.3 points per game. To years later, in August 1968, he was a member of the junior national team that a silver medal at the same championship in Vigo, Spain. Over six tournament games, he averaged 5.6 points per game.

Personal life
In May 2007, his son Jovan (also a professional basketball player) was murdered in Belgrade, Serbia.

References

1948 births
Living people
Basketball players from Belgrade
Croatian basketball coaches
Croatian men's basketball players
Croatian people of Serbian descent
BKK Radnički players
KK Split players
Point guards
Serbian expatriate basketball people in Croatia
Serbian men's basketball coaches
Serbian men's basketball players
Yugoslav men's basketball players